James Shawler (March 6, 1878 - February 8, 1925) was an American baseball outfielder in the pre-Negro leagues. He played from 1908 to 1913 with various teams. He played mostly with the Indianapolis ABCs. He captained the Chicago Union Giants in 1909, when they won 46 out of 56 games played.

References

External links
  and Seamheads

1878 births
Indianapolis ABCs players
Minneapolis Keystones players
1925 deaths
Baseball players from Louisville, Kentucky
20th-century African-American people
Baseball outfielders